Giuseppe Sogni (May 18, 1795 – August 11, 1874) was an Italian painter.

He was born in Robbiano near Crema, Lombardy. He began studying sculpture under Vincenzo Pacetti, but chose painting as a career. From 1832 to 1836, he was a pupil of Luigi Sabatelli at the Brera Academy. He painted large historical canvases and portraits. He first became professor of painting in Bologna, then became professor of figures (physiognomy) at the Academy in Milan. He helped engrave plates on anatomy by Giacomo Bossi. He painted the ceiling of the Hall of the Society of Gardens in Milan, frescoed in Santa Chiara in Busnago, and in San Pietro in Novara.

He retired from the academy in 1861, and died in Milan.

Sources
History and bibliography of anatomic illustration in its relation to ...By Ludwig Choulant, Edward Clark Streeter, page 337.

1795 births
1874 deaths
19th-century Italian people
18th-century Italian painters
Italian male painters
19th-century Italian painters
Italian neoclassical painters
19th-century Italian male artists
18th-century Italian male artists